Colibri is a 1924 German silent film directed by Victor Janson and starring Ossi Oswalda and Bruno Kastner.

The film's sets were designed by the art director Jacek Rotmil.

Cast
 Ossi Oswalda as Colibri  
 Victor Janson as Boddy  
 Bruno Kastner as Reginald  
 Franz Egenieff as Percy F. Barrymore  
 Mara Markhoff as Magda  
 Paul Bildt as Stadnicky, Clown  
 Hans Junkermann as Tomaselli, Zirkusdirektor  
 Lydia Potechina as Arabella, seine Frau  
 Reinhold Hintze as Samson, Athlet 
 Hans Lipschütz as Marcus  
 M.O. Schiller as Löw  
 Hugo Döblin as Samuel, Althändler  
 Wilhelm Chandron as Wilcox, Laboratoriumsgehilfe  
 Erich Walter as Karmanoff, ein Russe 
 Tschunka Tschen as Dr. Yokito, ein Japaner

References

Bibliography
 Bock, Hans-Michael & Bergfelder, Tim. The Concise CineGraph. Encyclopedia of German Cinema. Berghahn Books, 2009.

External links

1924 films
Films of the Weimar Republic
German silent feature films
Films directed by Victor Janson
German black-and-white films